Isyss was an American R&B girl group. The original members consisted of LeTecia Harrison, Ardena Clark, Quierra "Qui Qui" Davis-Martin and La'Myia Good (older sister of actress Meagan Good). Ardena Clark removed herself from the group in 2003 shortly after the release of their debut album to study politics. She was replaced by a singer named "Love".

Discography

Music videos

Guest appearances

* indicates the single was not released for promotional purposes.

References

External links
 Allmusic

African-American musical groups
American contemporary R&B musical groups
American pop music groups
American girl groups